People's Party of Catalonia (in Catalan: Partit Popular de Catalunya, PPC) was a political party in Catalonia, Spain. PPC was founded in 1973 as from a split of the National Front of Catalonia (FNC).

History
Its secretary general was Joan Colomines i Puig. The party participated in the unitary organizations of the antifascist opposition in Catalonia, specially the Assembly of Catalonia. The first congress, and legal public act, of the party was celebrated in March 1976 in Barcelona.

In 1976 CSC merged with other groups and parties to form the Socialist Party of Catalonia–Congress.

See also
National Front of Catalonia
Socialist Party of Catalonia–Congress
List of political parties in Catalonia

References

Socialist parties in Catalonia
Socialist parties in Spain
Left-wing nationalist parties
Catalan nationalist parties
Anti-Francoism
Political parties established in 1973